George Munday (June 13, 1907 – October 1975) was a professional football player who played 4 seasons in the National Football League for the Cleveland Indians, New York Giants, Cincinnati Reds and St. Louis Gunners.

1907 births
1975 deaths
People from Greenwood County, Kansas
Players of American football from Kansas
Cincinnati Reds (NFL) players
Cleveland Indians (NFL 1931) players
New York Giants players
St. Louis Gunners players